Robert Sedgwick is an American actor. He is the  brother of actress Kyra Sedgwick.

Sedgwick graduated from Bennington College in 1984. That year, he made his debut on the television soap opera Another World as Hunter Bradshaw. During the 1980s, he appeared in several Hollywood movies, such as Staying Together, Morgan Stewart's Coming Home and Nasty Hero. In the 1990s, he appeared in several films, such as Tales from the Darkside: The Movie, Die Hard with a Vengeance and Vibrations. In 2005, Sedgwick appeared in the film Loverboy alongside his sister Kyra, brother-in-law Kevin Bacon, nephew and niece Travis and Sosie Bacon.

In 2003, Sedgwick was the voice of Smilies #3 in the video game Manhunt.

He also made television appearances for television shows, such One Life to Live, Law & Order, Deadline and Ed.

Filmography
 Another World (TV Series) (1984-1985) - Hunter Bradshaw
 Morgan Stewart's Coming Home (1987) - Craighton
 Nasty Hero (TV) (1987) - Brad
 Staying Together (1989) - Doctor
 Tales from the Darkside: The Movie (1990) - Lee (segment "Lot 249")
 Tune in Tomorrow... (1990) - Elmore Dubarque
 One Life to Live (TV Series) (1990) - Greg Ellis
 Law & Order (TV Series) (1993-2005) - Elliot Peters/Mickey
 Die Hard with a Vengeance (1995) - Rolf
 Vibrations (1996) - Bugger
 Side Streets (1998) - Frank
 Perfect Murder, Perfect Town: JonBenét and the City of Boulder (TV) (2000) - Chris Wolf
 Deadline (TV Series) (2000) - Peter Stoneman
 Ed (TV Series) (2001)
 Law & Order: Special Victims Unit (TV Series) (2001) - James Campbell
 Law & Order: Criminal Intent (TV Series) (2004) - Mike
 Everyone's Depressed (2005) - Tennis Pro
 Loverboy (2005) - Emily's 3rd Grade Teacher
 The Mirror (2005) - Adam
 Leaving Gussie (2007) - Rex
 30 Rock (TV Series) (2008) - Archery Coach
 Damages (TV Series) (2010) - Donnie Rhyne
 Banshee (2016) - Hightower
 Police State (2016) - Desk Sergeant
 The Blacklist (2017) - Tyson Pryor

External links

American male film actors
American male soap opera actors
Place of birth missing (living people)
Year of birth missing (living people)
American male television actors
Bennington College alumni
Jewish American male actors
Living people
Sedgwick family